Parkway High School is a public high school located in Rockford, Ohio.  It is the only high school in the Parkway Local Schools district.  Their nickname is the Panthers.  They are a member of the Midwest Athletic Conference. Parkway Local School District was created in 1961–1962, when Willshire and Rockford School Districts merged.  Mendon-Union joined Parkway Local School District during the 1992–1993 school year.

Ohio High School Athletic Association State Championships 

 Baseball - 1987,1991 
 Girls Volleyball – 1996,1997 
 Boys Track: Jacob Fox 110 Meter Hurdles and Long Jump 2007
OHSAA State Appearances:
 Girls Volleyball: 2005 (Runners-Up), 2010
 Softball: 1997, 1998, 2013
 Girls Track: 1987 Runner Up
 Girls Volleyball: 2010 State Semi-Finalist

Notable alumni

 Jordan Thompson - Detroit Lions

References

External links 

 District Website
 Parkway Independent
 Athletic & Music Boosters

High schools in Mercer County, Ohio
Public high schools in Ohio